Ongenga is a constituency in the Ohangwena Region of Namibia, on the border to Angola. It had 21,474 in 2004 and 12,682 registered voters .

The district centre is the settlement of Ongenga. The constituency is sharing boundaries with Cunene Province in the southern Angola on the North, Engela Constituency on the South and East, and Omusati Region on the West.

Politics
As is common in all constituencies of former Owamboland, Namibia's ruling SWAPO Party has dominated elections since independence. 

It won the 2015 regional election by a landslide. Its candidate Sakaria Haimudi gathered 6,135 votes, while the only opposition candidate, Ferdinand Nghiitete of the Rally for Democracy and Progress (RDP), received 177 votes. SWAPO also won the 2020 regional election. Its candidate Matheus Shikongo received 4,636 votes, far ahead of Shipanduleni Mwahafa of the Independent Patriots for Change (IPC), an opposition party formed in August 2020, who obtained 901 votes.

External sources 
https://ohangwenarc.gov.na/ongenga-constituency

References 

Constituencies of Ohangwena Region
States and territories established in 1992
1992 establishments in Namibia